Is It Love or Is It Love? may refer to:

Music
Is It Love? (Cilla Black album)
Is It Love? Ultra Naté Best Remixes, Vol. 1, an album by Ultra Naté

Songs
 "Is It Love" (Mr. Mister song), 1986
 "Is It Love" (Twenty 4 Seven song), 1993
 "Is It Love?" (Chili Hi Fly  song), 1998
 "Is It Love?" (iiO song), 2006
"Is It Love", a single by Gang of Four from the 1983 album Hard 
"Is It Love", a song by Kendrick Lamar from his 2009 extended play Kendrick Lamar
"Is It Love", a song by Bette Midler from her 1983 album No Frills
"Is It Love", a song by Pink from her 2000 album Can't Take Me Home
"Is It Love", a song by Play from the 2002 album Play (Play album)
"Is It Love?", a song by Cilla Black from the film Ferry Cross the Mersey	1965
"Is It Love", a song by Foster and Lloyd	1990
"Is It Love", a song by T. Rex, B-side to "Ride a White Swan"
"Is It Love", a song by Lisa Stewart from her 1992 album Lisa Stewart

See also
Is This Love? (disambiguation), the name of several songs